The Henry Hudson Parkway is a  parkway in New York City. The southern terminus is in Manhattan at 72nd Street, where the parkway continues south as the West Side Highway. It is often erroneously referred to as the West Side Highway throughout its entire course in Manhattan. The northern terminus is at the Bronx–Westchester county boundary, where it continues north as the Saw Mill River Parkway. All but the northernmost mile of the road is co-signed as New York State Route 9A (NY 9A). In addition, the entirety of the parkway is designated New York State Route 907V (NY 907V), an unsigned reference route.

The owners of the parkway are the New York State Department of Transportation, New York City Department of Transportation, New York City Department of Parks and Recreation, Metropolitan Transportation Authority, Amtrak, and Port Authority of New York and New Jersey. The Henry Hudson Parkway was created by the Henry Hudson Parkway Authority, which was run by "master builder" Robert Moses. The highway itself was constructed from 1934 to 1937.

Route description

The Henry Hudson Parkway begins at 72nd Street, which also serves as the north end of the West Side Highway and the last remaining section of the West Side Highway's predecessor, the Miller Highway. The junction is numbered as exit 8, continuing the numbering scheme used on the West Side Highway. It heads northward along the west side of Manhattan, connecting to West 79th Street with a large interchange and to other surface streets with more intermittent exits along the way. The parkway continues in a northerly direction, running almost parallel to Riverside Drive north of West 158th Street.  It passes under the Trans-Manhattan Expressway (I-95 and U.S. 1) and the George Washington Bridge as it continues its progression through Fort Washington Park, Fort Tryon Park, and Inwood Hill Park. It then runs northward across the Henry Hudson Bridge into the Bronx.

Upon entering the Bronx, the parkway passes through Spuyten Duyvil and Riverdale as it continues northward, edging slightly to the northeast. Between exits 20 and 22, Riverdale Avenue is split into service roads along the parkway. At exit 23, NY 9A leaves the parkway for U.S. Route 9 (US 9) while the parkway enters Van Cortlandt Park. Soon after it enters the park, the parkway has an interchange with the Mosholu Parkway, which connects it to I-87.  Less than a mile farther on, the parkway becomes the Saw Mill River Parkway as it enters Westchester County.

History

The Parkway was completed on October 12, 1937, under New York master builder Robert Moses.  It cost $109 million, twice as expensive as the $49 million Hoover Dam that was built in the same period.  The Parkway was part of Moses's "West Side Improvement" and included covering the New York Central Railroad's West Side Line, creating the Freedom Tunnel.  The covered portion is partially used for the highway and also expands the Riverside Park designed by Frederick Law Olmsted.

On July 23, 1991, construction workers found a dead child in a fridge just off the Henry Hudson Parkway. More than twenty years later, in 2013, a 52-year-old Eduardo Juarez confessed to assaulting and killing the young girl, who was his cousin.

On May 12, 2005, part of a retaining wall at Castle Village collapsed onto the northbound lanes of the parkway, just north of the George Washington Bridge, shutting it down shortly before rush hour. The clean-up began quickly, and the road re-opened on May 15.

Future
The Henry Hudson Parkway is a candidate for designation as a New York State Scenic Byway, the first in New York City. At the request of the Henry Hudson Parkway Task Force, in 2005 the New York Metropolitan Transportation Council approved funding to develop a comprehensive corridor management plan, a requirement for its designation.

Exit list

See also

References

External links

 Background on the parkway's history and the scenic byway initiative
 

Historic American Engineering Record in New York City
Parkways in New York City
Robert Moses projects
Riverdale, Bronx
Transportation in the Bronx
Transportation in Manhattan